André Fraysse (1902-1984) was a French perfumer.

He was noted for his work with Lanvin. His creations included:
 Arpège (1927) with Paul Vacher
 Eau de Lanvin
 Prétexte (1937)
 Rumeur (1934), relaunched in a new formulation 2006
 Scandal (1933)

Fraysse's son, Richard Fraysse, is an in-house perfumer at Parfums Caron.

References

French perfumers
1902 births
1976 deaths